Michael Stinear (born 8 August 1984) is a former Australian rules football player and current coach who serves as the head coach of the Melbourne Football Club in the AFL Women's.

Early life

Stinear was born on 8 August 1984, and played his junior and some senior football (as a junior) for the Beaconsfield Football Club. He played under-18s football for the Dandenong Stingrays in the TAC Cup.

Playing career

Stinear was drafted by Carlton with pick 62 in the 2003 rookie draft. He spent 2003 on the Blues' list without playing a game, before moving to Queensland to play with the Mount Gravatt Football Club. He won the 2004 Grogan Medal as the QAFL's best player and was named as Mount Gravatt's captain in 2005. He returned to Victoria in 2011 and captain-coached St Kilda City from 2012 to 2013.

Coaching career

Stinear coached the under-16s at the Oakleigh Chargers and was named as the team's head coach in 2014 after his stint at St Kilda City. He led the team to back-to-back premierships in 2014 and 2015 and a spot in the finals in 2016. In 2016, he was announced as the inaugural coach of the Melbourne Football Club in the 2017 AFL Women's, also taking on a role as a men's development coach. He guided the team to a third-place finish, recording five wins and two losses for the season.

Coaching statistics

Statistics are correct to the end of the 2017 season

|- style="background-color: #EAEAEA"
! scope="row" style="font-weight:normal"|2017
|
| 7 || 5 || 2 || 0 || 71.4% || 3 || 8
|- class="sortbottom"
! colspan=2| Career totals
! 7
! 5
! 2
! 0
! 71.4%
! colspan=2|
|}

References

External links

Mick Stinear's profile from AustralianFootball.com

Living people
1984 births
AFL Women's coaches
Dandenong Stingrays players
Carlton Football Club players
Mount Gravatt Football Club players
Australian rules footballers from Victoria (Australia)